Nathan Thomas (born 27 September 1994) is a professional footballer who plays as a winger for National League club York City.

Playing career

Sunderland
Thomas served as an apprentice at Sunderland after leaving Newcastle United in 2011, and played in December 2012 one month on loan for Darlington 1883. After his loan return from Darlington, he played until May 2013 and then left Sunderland after refusing a new contract.

Plymouth Argyle
He was signed by Plymouth Argyle until the end of the 2013–14 season by manager John Sheridan in December 2013. He made his debut in the Football League on 29 December, replacing Lewis Alessandra 81 minutes into a 1–1 draw with AFC Wimbledon at Kingsmeadow. He scored his first competitive goal for Plymouth Argyle in a 2–0 victory against Hartlepool United in League Two on 20 September 2014.

Motherwell
On 2 February 2015, Thomas signed for Scottish Premiership club Motherwell.

Hartlepool United
On 12 January 2016, Thomas signed for League Two club Hartlepool United from Mansfield Town. On Thomas' debut, he assisted the winner for Scott Fenwick in a 1–0 win against Wycombe Wanderers. In September 2016, Thomas scored all five of Hartlepool's goals that month. His goal in a 3–0 victory against Grimsby Town was voted as Hartlepool United's goal of the decade. It was also nominated as the Sky Bet EFL goal of the month for November 2016. Following Hartlepool's relegation to the National League, Thomas attracted interest from Middlesbrough and Leeds United.

Sheffield United
On 15 May 2017, Thomas joined Championship side Sheffield United on a three-year deal. He scored his first goal for Sheffield United on his debut in a 3–2 EFL Cup win against Walsall on 9 August 2017.

He was transfer-listed by Sheffield United at the end of the 2017–18 season. On 3 July 2018, he signed for EFL League Two side Notts County on a season-long loan.

Thomas then cancelled his loan at Notts by mutual consent on 29 January, before later signing on loan with Carlisle United until the end of the 2018–19 season.

Prior to the 2019–20 season, Thomas signed a season-long loan with Gillingham, however the loan was terminated during pre-season, reportedly because Thomas and his family could not settle in the south. Instead he began a second loan spell with Carlisle United.

Hamilton Academical
On 6 November 2020, Thomas signed for Scottish Premiership side Hamilton Academical. On 19 May 2021 it was announced that he would leave Hamilton at the end of the season, following the expiry of his contract.

York City
On 6 October 2022, Thomas returned to football when he joined National League club York City on a short-term contract until January 2023. He scored a brace in a 5–0 win against Blyth Spartans in the FA Trophy. On 30 December 2022, Thomas extended his contract until the end of the season.

Career statistics

Honours
Shrewsbury Town
EFL Trophy runner-up: 2017–18

References

External links

1994 births
People from the Borough of Stockton-on-Tees
Footballers from County Durham
Living people
English footballers
Association football wingers
Sunderland A.F.C. players
Darlington F.C. players
Plymouth Argyle F.C. players
Motherwell F.C. players
Mansfield Town F.C. players
Hartlepool United F.C. players
Sheffield United F.C. players
Notts County F.C. players
Carlisle United F.C. players
Hamilton Academical F.C. players
York City F.C. players
English Football League players
Scottish Professional Football League players